Veliki Vrh is a settlement in the Municipality of Cirkulane in the Haloze area of eastern Slovenia. It lies in the hills above the right bank of the Drava River. The area traditionally belonged to the Styria region. It is now included in the Drava Statistical Region.

The local church is dedicated to Saint Anne and belongs to the Parish of Cirkulane. It was built in the late 17th century.

References

External links

Veliki Vrh on Geopedia

Populated places in the Municipality of Cirkulane